Louth Town F.C. is an English football club based in Louth, Lincolnshire.

History
They were established in 2007 following the demise of Louth United. They played in the Central Midlands League until they were promoted to the Northern Counties East League in 2010.

At the end of the 2012-2013 season, Louth Town finished in their highest position of 3rd in the Northern Counties East League. Manager Daryl Clare, in his first season with the club as manager, took the club to its highest ever league position.

The club resigned from the Northern Counties East Football League at the end of the 2014-15 season and joined the Lincolnshire Football League, taking the place previously occupied by their reserve team.

In June 2016, Louth Town were blocked access to the Park Avenue group by the landlord who intends to use the land for development.  Louth Town have relocated outside of the Town at the Marshlands facility in Saltfleetby.

Ground
Louth Town now play their home games at the Marshlands facility in Saltfleetby.

Honours
Central Midlands League Supreme Division
Champions 2009–10
Central Midlands League Premier Division
Champions 2008–09

Records
FA Cup
First Qualifying Round 2011–12
FA Vase
First Round 2009–10, 2010–11

References

External links
 Louth Town official website
 

Football clubs in England
Football clubs in Lincolnshire
Association football clubs established in 2007
2007 establishments in England
Louth, Lincolnshire
Central Midlands Football League
Northern Counties East Football League
Lincolnshire Football League